Alberto III Pio, Prince of Carpi (23 July 1475 – 1531), was an Italian Renaissance prince. He cultivated interest in humanism and was an intimate of the Medici popes.

Born at Carpi in 1475, only two years before the death of his father, he had been raised under the guardianship of his paternal uncle Marco and his maternal uncle, humanist Giovanni Pico della Mirandola. They supervised his education and engaged as tutor Aldus Manutius, who was later to found the famed Aldine Press in Venice, which Alberto funded.

Alberto was educated first at Ferrara, where he attended lectures by Pietro Pomponazzi and became friends with Pietro Bembo and Ludovico Ariosto, then at Padua. For most of his career he had served as a diplomat, first as the agent of the Gonzaga to the French court and later in the pay of King Louis XII. In 1508 he was one of the negotiators of the League of Cambrai, and in January 1510 he became the ambassador of Maximilian I, to the Papacy, but in 1520, with the ascendancy of Charles V, Alberto committed a fatal error by switching his allegiance to Francis I, King of France.

Alberto was a close friend of Pope Leo X and is known to have favored the election of Giulio de' Medici to the Papacy as Clement VII.  He helped to bring about the alliance between Clement and Francis I that was published on 5 January 1525 and proposed the marriage between Catherine de'Medici, Clement's niece, and Francis' second son, Henry II. Such diplomatic success had its consequences. Mendoza, Charles V's representative in Rome, described Alberto as follows, "Carpi is a devil; he knows everything and is mixed up in everything; the Emperor must either win him over or destroy him." The latter was Alberto's fate, for after the papal alliance with Francis was made public, Charles was reported to have become enraged. Shortly thereafter on 24 February 1525 Charles' troops defeated and captured Francis at the Battle of Pavia, and eight days later his troops under Prospero Colonna occupied Carpi and deprived Alberto of his rule.

Alberto fled to Rome and attempted to reclaim his lands but without success. Eventually Charles turned them over to Duke Alfonso I of Ferrara in 1530. When Charles' troops sacked Rome in May 1527, Alberto sought refuge with Clement VII in the Castel Sant'Angelo. He then fled to France where he was warmly welcomed and where he remained until his death in January 1531.

Alberto had been a defender of the Church since the earliest discussions about its reformation arose at the Fifth Lateran Council in December 1513, well before the publication of Luther's 95 theses in 1517. By 1525 he had become embroiled in an extended dispute with Erasmus that continued for the remainder of his life and that was not concluded until two months after his death with the publication of his XXIII Libri.

References

Bibliography
 

 

1472 births
1531 deaths
People from Carpi, Emilia-Romagna
Italian nobility
Italian Renaissance humanists
Italian diplomats